Malik Deniz Fathi (born 29 October 1983) is a German former professional footballer who played as a left-back.

Club career
From 2003 to 2008 he played as a defender for Hertha BSC.

On 12 March 2008, he signed for Spartak Moscow. In January 2010, he was loaned to 1. FSV Mainz 05. This move was made permanent in July 2011. He was loaned to Kayserispor for the 2012–13 season, but at the end of the winter transfer window of 2012–13, he joined TSV 1860 Munich on a half-season loan.

On 14 April 2014, it was announced that his expiring contract at Mainz 05 would not be extended. On 30 January 2015 he moved to Spanish Segunda División B club Atlético Baleares. Fathi played almost 100 league matches in the third highest level of the Spanish football pyramid.

International career
Fathi represented Germany Under-20 team at the 2003 FIFA World Youth Championship, Germany Under-21 team at European under-21 championship 2006.

He earned his first cap for the Germany national team on 16 August 2006 in a 3–0 home friendly win against Sweden. He replaced Marcell Jansen at half-time. In his second and last international, he replaced Thomas Hitzlsperger against Georgia for the final 15 minutes of a 2-0 friendly win in Rostock.

Personal life
Before beginning his football career he played tennis for Hertha Zehlendorf Berlin and for Borussia Berlin. He also plays basketball in his spare time.

Career statistics

References

External links 

 
 
 
 
 

1983 births
Living people
German people of Turkish descent
German footballers
Footballers from Berlin
Association football defenders
Germany international footballers
Germany under-21 international footballers
Germany youth international footballers
Bundesliga players
2. Bundesliga players
Russian Premier League players
Süper Lig players
Segunda División B players
Hertha BSC players
Hertha BSC II players
FC Spartak Moscow players
1. FSV Mainz 05 players
1. FSV Mainz 05 II players
Kayserispor footballers
TSV 1860 Munich players
CD Atlético Baleares footballers
German expatriate footballers
German expatriate sportspeople in Russia
Expatriate footballers in Russia
German expatriate sportspeople in Spain
Expatriate footballers in Spain